Yoshio Nanbu (born 22 March 1933) is a Japanese weightlifter. He competed in the men's bantamweight event at the 1956 Summer Olympics.

References

External links
 

1933 births
Living people
Japanese male weightlifters
Olympic weightlifters of Japan
Weightlifters at the 1956 Summer Olympics
Place of birth missing (living people)
Asian Games medalists in weightlifting
Weightlifters at the 1954 Asian Games
Asian Games bronze medalists for Japan
Medalists at the 1954 Asian Games
20th-century Japanese people
21st-century Japanese people